Viviana “Nana” Fiol Vilches (born 13 July 1989) is a Puerto Rican retired footballer who has played as a midfielder. She has been a member of the Puerto Rico women's national team.

References

1989 births
Living people
Women's association football midfielders
Puerto Rican women's footballers
People from Caguas, Puerto Rico
Puerto Rico women's international footballers
Competitors at the 2010 Central American and Caribbean Games